Giles John Harry Goschen, 4th Viscount Goschen (born 16 November 1965), is a British Conservative politician.

Goschen is the son of John Goschen, 3rd Viscount Goschen, by his second wife Alvin England. He was educated at Heatherdown School, near Ascot in Berkshire, and Eton. He succeeded his father in the viscountcy in 1977 at the age of eleven. After a brief stint as a city stockbroker he spent time in Zambia with his future wife Sarah Horsnail to work for a conservation agency, but returned to Britain.

Goschen served under John Major as a Lord-in-waiting from 1992 to 1994 and as Under Secretary of State for Transport from 1994 to 1997. In 1999 he was among the Conservative hereditary peers elected to remain in the House of Lords after the passing of the House of Lords Act 1999, the youngest chosen by any party group.

In 2010, he lived in Sussex with his wife and three children.

References

External links

1965 births
Living people
British people of German descent
People educated at Heatherdown School
People educated at Eton College
Conservative Party (UK) hereditary peers
Giles John Harry Goschen, 4th Viscount
Giles

Hereditary peers elected under the House of Lords Act 1999